Ignacio Hirigoyen (born 23 January 1976) is a former professional tennis player from Argentina.

Career
Hirigoyen was an NCAA All-American for the Southern Methodist University (SMU) in 1999. His 34 singles wins that year was a SMU record.

He defeated Peru's Luis Horna at the 2001 Cerveza Club Colombia Open, then lost in the second round to Fernando Vicente. This was his only win on the ATP Tour.

Personal life
Hirigoyen has two daughters and a wife and currently resides in Dallas, Texas. He is also a lawyer.

Challenger titles

Doubles: (1)

References

External links 
 
 

1976 births
Living people
Argentine male tennis players
SMU Mustangs men's tennis players
Sportspeople from Bahía Blanca